DXTY (101.1 FM) was a radio station owned and operated by Nation Broadcasting Corporation.

History
The station began operations in 1979 as MRS 101.1, airing an adult contemporary format. In 1998, after NBC was acquired by PLDT subsidiary MediaQuest Holdings, the station rebranded as Tony @ Rhythms 101.1 and switched to an oldies format, ranging from the 50s and 60s. It went off the air in 2002.

References

Radio stations in Zamboanga City
Radio stations established in 1979
Radio stations disestablished in 2002
Defunct radio stations in the Philippines